Ilya Kapovich is a Russian-American mathematician and a Professor of Mathematics at the Hunter College of CUNY. He is known for his contributions to geometric group theory, geometric topology, and complexity theory.

Career 
He received his Ph.D. from the Graduate Center of CUNY in 1996 under the direction of Gilbert Baumslag. After postdoc positions at Rutgers University and Hebrew University, he worked at the University of Illinois at Urbana Champaign from 2000 to 2018. While at Illinois, he has had several visiting positions. Most notably, he was an Alexander von Humboldt Foundation research fellow at Frankfurt University during Spring 2006, and Ada Peluso Visiting Professor at Hunter College during Spring 2017.

Recognition 
In 2012, he was named an inaugural fellow of the American Mathematical Society. He delivered an invited address at 2008 Spring Eastern Sectional meeting of the AMS.

Contributions 

He has worked on problems related to automorphisms of free groups, free-by-cyclic groups, mapping class groups as well as complexity and decision problems in group theory. He has supervised 9 PhD students to completion as of 2022. 

Between 2010 and 2015, he served on the editorial board of the LMS Journal of Mathematics and Computation. 

His older brother Michael Kapovich is a professor of mathematics at the University of California, Davis, and his twin brother Vitali Kapovitch is a professor of mathematics at the University of Toronto.

Selected publications

References

External links 
 

City University of New York alumni
20th-century American mathematicians
21st-century American mathematicians
20th-century Russian mathematicians
21st-century Russian mathematicians
University of Illinois Urbana-Champaign faculty
Group theorists
Fellows of the American Mathematical Society
Year of birth missing (living people)
Living people